Balaam (Standard Bīlʿam Tiberian Bīlʿām) is a diviner in the Torah (Pentateuch) whose story begins in Chapter 22 of the Book of Numbers. Ancient references to Balaam consider him a non-Israelite, a prophet, and the son of Beor. King Balak of Moab offered him money to curse Israel, but Balaam blessed the Israelites instead, as dictated by God. Nevertheless, he is reviled as a "wicked man" in both the Torah and the New Testament. According to the Book of Revelation, Balaam told King Balak how to get the Israelites to commit sin by enticing them with sexual immorality and food sacrificed to idols. The Israelites fell into transgression due to these traps and God unleashed a deadly plague upon them as a result.

Balaam and Balak
The main story of Balaam occurs during the sojourn of the Israelites in the plains of Moab, east of the Jordan River, at the close of forty years of wandering, shortly before the death of Moses and the crossing of the Jordan. The Israelites have already defeated two kings in Transjordan: Sihon, king of the Amorites, and Og, king of Bashan. Balak, king of Moab, consequently becomes alarmed, and sends elders of Midian and his Moabite messengers, to Balaam, son of Beor, to induce him to come and curse Israel. Balaam's location, Pethor, is simply given as "which is by the river of the land of the children of his people" in the Masoretic Text and the Septuagint, though the Samaritan Pentateuch, Vulgate, and Peshitta all identify his land as Ammon.

Balaam sends back word that he can only do what YHWH commands, and God has, via a nocturnal dream, told him not to go. Balak consequently sends higher-ranking priests and offers Balaam honours; Balaam continues to press God, and God finally permits him to go but with instructions to say only what He commands. Balaam then sets out in the morning with the princes of Moab. God becomes angry that he went, implying that he only used Balaam as a tool to further his will, and sends the Angel of the Lord (Numbers 22:22) to prevent him. At first, the angel is seen only by the donkey Balaam is riding, which tries to avoid the angel. After Balaam starts punishing the donkey for refusing to move, it is miraculously given the power to speak to Balaam (Numbers 22:28), and it complains about Balaam's treatment. At this point, Balaam is allowed to see the angel, who informs him that the donkey's turning away from the messenger is the only reason the angel did not kill Balaam. Balaam immediately repents, but is told to go on.

Balak meets with Balaam at Kirjat Huzoth, and they go to the "high places of Baal", and offer sacrifices on seven altars, leading to Balaam being given a prophecy by Yahweh, which He speaks to Balak. However, the prophecy blesses Israel; Balak remonstrates, but Balaam reminds him that he can only speak the words put in his mouth, so Balak takes him to another "high place" at Pisgah, to try again. Building another seven altars here, and making sacrifices on each, Balaam provides another prophecy blessing Israel.

Balaam finally gets taken by a now very frustrated Balak to Peor, and, after the seven sacrifices there, decides not to "seek enchantments" but instead looks upon the Israelites from the peak. The Spirit of God comes upon Balaam and he delivers a third positive prophecy concerning Israel. Balak's anger rises to the point where he threatens Balaam, but Balaam merely offers a prediction of fate. Balaam then looks upon the Kenites, and Amalekites and offers two more predictions of their fates. Balak and Balaam then go to their respective homes.

Later, Numbers 25:1-9 describes how Israel engaged in the Heresy of Peor. Numbers 31:16 blames this on Balaam's advice and because of his culpability in the incident, which resulted in deadly divine judgements against the Israelites who participated, he was eventually killed in a retaliatory battle against Midian in Numbers 31:8.

Deuteronomy 23:3–6 summarises these incidents, and further states that the Ammonites were associated with the Moabites. Joshua, in his farewell speech, also makes reference to it. With God's protection taken from him, Balaam is later listed among the Midianites who were killed in revenge for the "matter of Peor". Joshua 13:22 records that Balaam died "by the sword" during a battle for the Reubenite occupation of Moabite land.

Revelation also states that Balaam "taught Balak to cast a stumbling block before the children of Israel."

The story of Balaam and Balak is also made reference to in chapter 10 of 2 Meqabyan, a book considered canonical in the Ethiopian Orthodox Tewahedo Church.

Prophecies

All the prophecies which Balaam makes take the form of (Hebrew) poems:
 The first, Numbers 23:7–10, prophesies the unique exaltation of the Kingdom of Israel, and its countless numbers.
 The second, Numbers 23:18–24, celebrates the moral virtue of Israel, its monarchy, and its military conquests.
 The third, Numbers 24:3–9, celebrates the glory and conquests of Israel's monarchy.   It is the source of the liturgical prayer Ma Tovu - "How good are your tents, O Jacob, your tabernacles, O Israel!"
 The fourth, Numbers 24:14–19, prophesies the coming of a king who will conquer Edom and Moab.
 The fifth, Numbers 24:20, concerns the ruins of Amalek.
 The sixth, Numbers 24:21–22, concerns the destruction of the Kenites by Assyria.
 The seventh, Numbers 24:23–24, concerns "ships of Kittim" coming from the west to attack Assyria and Eber.

The poems fall into three groups. The first group consists of two poems which characteristically start immediately. The third group of three poems also start immediately, but are much shorter. The second group, however, consists of two poems which both start:

Balaam the son of Beor hath said, and the man whose eyes are open hath said: He hath said, which heard the words of God, which saw the vision of the Almighty, falling into a trance, but having his eyes open ...

Of these, the first and third groups are considered, according to the Documentary Hypothesis, to originate within the Elohist text, whereas the second group is considered to belong to the Jahwist. Thus the Elohist describes Balaam giving two blessings, making sacrifices on seven altars, at the high places of Baal, before each, then deciding not to "seek enchantments" after the third set of sacrifices, but to "set his face upon the wilderness," which Balak views as a third blessing, and so Balaam then gives the three final predictions of fate. Conversely, in the Jahwist source, Balaam arrives, the spirit of God comes upon him, and he simply delivers a blessing and a prophecy, in succession.

Agag, mentioned in the third poem, is described as a great king, which does not correspond to the king of the Amalekites who was named Agag, and described in I Samuel 15, since that description considers Amalek to be small and obscure. While it is the Masoretic text of the poem that uses the word Agag, the Septuagint, other Greek versions, and the Samaritan Pentateuch, all have Gog. These names are consequently thought to be textual corruptions, and Og has been suggested as the original.

The final three poems do not refer either to Israel or to Moab, and are thus considered unusual, since they seem to have little relevance to the narrative. It is thought that they may have been added to bring the number of poems either up to five, if inserted into the Elohist source, or up to seven, if only inserted once JE was constructed. While the sixth poem refers to Assyria, it is uncertain whether it is an historical reference to ancient Ninevah, or a prophecy, which some religious commentators consider refers to the Seleucid kingdom of Syria, which also took the name Assyria. The seventh is also ambiguous, and may either be a reference to the Sea Peoples, or, again in the view of some religious commentators, to the conquest of Persia by Alexander the Great.

In the view of some schools of textual criticism the narrative, excepting the episode involving the donkey, is simply a framework invented in order to be able to insert much older poems.

Balaam in rabbinic literature
In rabbinic literature Balaam is represented as one of seven gentile prophets; the other six being Beor (Balaam's father), Job, and Job's four friends (Talmud, B. B. 15b). In this literature, Balaam gradually acquired a position among the non-Jews, which was exalted as much as that of Moses among the Jews (Midrash Numbers Rabbah 20); at first being a mere interpreter of dreams, but later becoming a magician, until finally the spirit of prophecy descended upon him (ib. 7).

According to a negative view of Balaam in the Talmud, Balaam possessed the gift of being able to ascertain the exact moment during which God is wroth — a gift bestowed upon no other creature. Balaam's intention was to curse the Israelites at this moment of wrath, and thus cause God himself to destroy them; but God purposely restrained His anger in order to baffle the wicked prophet and to save the nation from extermination (Talmud, Berachot 7a). The Talmud also recounts a more positive view of Balaam, stating that when the Law was given to Israel, a mighty voice shook the foundations of the earth, so much so that all kings trembled, and in their consternation turned to Balaam, inquiring whether this upheaval of nature portended a second deluge; the prophet assured them that what they heard was the voice of God, giving the sacred law to the Israelites (Talmud, Zeb. 116a).

According to Jewish legend, Balaam was made this powerful in order to prevent the non-Jewish tribes from saying: "If we had only had our own Moses, we would be as pious as the Jews." The wicked Balaam is included in the list of persons born circumcised along with Moses in the book Abbot De-Rabbi Natan.

In rabbinical literature the epithet rasha, translating as the wicked one, is often attached to the name of Balaam (Talmud Berachot l.c.; Taanit 20a; Midrash Numbers Rabbah 20:14). Balaam is pictured as blind in one eye and lame in one foot (Talmud Sanhedrin 105a); and his disciples (followers) are distinguished by three morally corrupt qualities:
 an evil eye
 a haughty bearing
 an avaricious spirit

Due to his behavior with the Midianites, the Rabbis interpret Balaam as responsible for the behavior during the Heresy of Peor, which they consider to have been unchastity, and consequently the death of 24,000 victims of the plague which God sent as punishment. When Balaam saw that he could not curse the children of Israel, the Rabbis assert that he advised Balak, as a last resort, to tempt the Hebrew nation to immoral acts and, through these, to the worship of Baal-peor. The God of the Hebrews, adds Balaam, according to the Rabbis, hates lewdness; and severe chastisement must follow (San. 106a; Yer. ib. x. 28d; Num. R. l.c.).

The Rabbis, playing on the name Balaam, call him "Belo 'Am" (without people; that is, without a share with the people in the world to come), or "Billa' 'Am" (one that ruined a people); and this hostility against his memory finds its climax in the dictum that whenever one discovers a feature of wickedness or disgrace in his life, one should preach about it (Sanh. 106b). In the process of killing Balaam (Num. xxxi. 8), all four legal methods of execution—stoning, burning, decapitating, and strangling—were employed (Sanh. l.c.). He met his death at the age of thirty-three (ib.); and it is stated that he had no portion in the world to come (Sanh. x. 2; 90a). The book devotes a special section to the history of the prophet discussing why God has taken away the power of prophecy from the Gentiles (Tan., Balak, 1). Moses is expressly mentioned as the author of this episode in the Pentateuch (B. B. 14b).J. Sr. H. M.

"Ahithophel of the house of Israel and Balaam of the heathen nations were the two great sages of the world who, failing to show gratitude to God for their wisdom, perished in dishonor. To them the prophetic word finds application: 'Let not the wise man glory in his wisdom,' Jer. ix. 23" (Num. R. xxii.).

In (Sanhedrin 106b) and (Giṭtin 57a) Balaam may be likened to Jesus. Some have theorized that Balaam became used as a pseudonym for Jesus in Jewish literature. Balaam's father Beor was a son of Laban. The Book of Jasher reports Balaam's sons were Jannes and Jambres

Balaam in the New Testament, Josephus, and Philo
In the New Testament, Balaam is cited as a type of avarice; for example in Book of Revelation 2:14 we read of false teachers at Pergamum who held the "teaching of Balaam, who taught Balak to cast a stumbling-block before the children of Israel, to eat things sacrificed to idols, and to commit fornication." Balaam has attracted much interest, alike from Jews, Christians, and Muslims. Josephus paraphrases the story more so, and speaks of Balaam as the best prophet of his time, but with a disposition ill-adapted to resist temptation. Philo describes him as a great magician in the Life of Moses; elsewhere he speaks of "the sophist Balaam, being," i.e. symbolizing "a vain crowd of contrary and warring opinions" and again as "a vain people" — both phrases being based on a mistaken etymology of the name Balaam.

A man also named Balaam also figures as an example of a false prophet motivated by greed or avarice in both 2 Peter 2:15 and in Jude 1:11. This Balaam is listed as the son of Bezer, which is usually identified as Beor.  Some authors claim that Bezer was the Aramaic pronunciation of Beor, while others hold that the author was attempting to play off the Hebrew word basar or "flesh" to insult Balaam.  Later Jewish tradition similarly played with Balaam's name to call him corrupt and imply bestiality.  Still other authors hold that Bezer and Beor are distinct, while still identifying the Balaams of the Old and New Testaments, claiming that Beor is Balaam's father and Bezer is Balaam's home town.

Balaam in the Quran

Regarding the Islamic view of Balaam,  no clear reference is made to Balaam in the Qur'an. However, the commentators argue that he is the one to whom the following text is referring:

The Muslim commentators explain that Balaam was a Canaanite who had been given knowledge of some of the books of God. His people asked him to curse Moses (Musa) and those who were with him, but he said, "How can I curse one who has angels with him?" They continued to press him, however, until he cursed the Israelites, and, as a consequence, they remained 40 years in the Wilderness of the Wanderings. Then, when he had cursed Moses, his tongue came out and fell upon his breast, and he began to pant like a dog.

The story as told by Tabari is somewhat more Biblical. Balaam had the knowledge of the Most Sacred Name of God, and whatever he asked of God was granted to him. The story of Balaam and the ass, then follows at length. When it came to the actual cursing, God "turned his tongue" so that the cursing fell upon his own people and the blessing upon Israel. Then his tongue came out and hung down on his breast. Finally, he advised his people to adorn and beautify their women and to send them out to ensnare the Israelites. The story of the plague at Baal-peor and of Cozbi and Zimri follows.

According to another story which al-Tabari gives, Balaam was a renegade Israelite who knew the Most Sacred Name, and to gain the things of this world, went over to the Canaanites. Al-Tha'labi adds that Balaam was descended from Lot. He gives, too, the story of Balaam's dream, his being forbidden by God to curse Israel. Another version is that Balak, the king of Bal'a, compelled Balaam to use the Most Sacred Name against Israel. The curse fell automatically, and Moses, having learned from whence it came, entreated God to take from Balaam his knowledge of the Name and his faith. This being done, they went out from him in the form of a white dove.

The Baghdadi historian Al Masudi said in his book Meadows of Gold and Mines of Gems that Balaam ben Beor was in a village in the lands of Shem (Canaan), and he is the son of Baura(Beor) ben Sanur ben Waseem ben Moab ben Lot ben Haran (PUT), and his prayers were answered, so his folks asked him to pray against Joshua ben Nun but he could not do it, so he advised some of the kings of the giants to show the pretty women and release them toward the camp of Joshua ben Nun, and so they did, and they (the Israelites) hurried up to the women and the plague spread among them and seventy thousand of them were dead.

Balaam and the Deir Alla inscription

In 1967, at Deir Alla, Jordan, archaeologists found an inscription with a story relating visions of the seer of the gods Bala'am, son of Be'or, who may be the same Bala'am mentioned in Numbers 22–24 and in other passages of the Bible. Bala'am is not specifically mentioned as a prophet of Yahweh in the Bible, but is called upon by Balak, a Moabite ruler, to curse the Israelites (Numbers Chapter 22). Although Bala’am evidently heard from Yahweh in the Biblical account,  Bala’am is associated with Ashtar, a god named Shgr, and Shadday gods and goddesses. Bala’am is blamed for teaching Balak how to remove Yahweh's covering from the Israelites through forbidden sexual relationships (Revelation 2:14).

The Oxford Handbook of Biblical Studies describes it as "the oldest example of a book in a West Semitic language written with the alphabet, and the oldest piece of Aramaic literature." The inscription is datable to ca. 840–760 BCE; it was painted in red and black inks, apparently to emphasize the text, on fragments of a plastered wall: 119 pieces of inked plaster were recovered.  According to the story in the inscription,<ref>J. Hoftijzer and G. van der Kooij, Aramaic Texts from Deir 'Alla Documenta et Monumenta Orientis Antiqui 19 (Leiden) 1976.</ref> Balaam wakes up weeping and tells his people that the gods appeared to him in the night telling him about a goddess threatening to destroy the land. She is to cover the sky and reduce the world to complete darkness. Meindert Dijkstra suggests that "the reticence of OT scholarship to take account of the text may be attributable to its damaged state, the difficulty of reconstructing and reading it, and the many questions it raises of script, language, literary form and religious content."

See also
 Balak (parsha)
 Biblical archaeology

Notes

References
 Ausloos, Hans, On an Obedient Prophet and a Fickle God. The Narrative of Balaam in Numbers 22–24, in Old Testament Essays 20 (2007) 84-104
 Hoftijzer, Jacob. “The Prophet Balaam in a 6th Century Aramaic Inscription.” Biblical Archaeologist 39.1 (March 1976), pp. 11–17 (electronic edition 2001).
 McCarter, P. Kyle. “The Balaam Texts from Deir Allā: The First Combination.” Bulletin of the American Schools of Oriental Research, no. 239 (Summer 1980), pp. 49–60.
 Savelle, Charles. 2009. Canonical and Extracanonical portraits of Balaam. Bibliotheca Sacra 166:387-404.
 Shenk, Robert. “The Coherence of the Biblical Story of Balaam.” Literature and Belief 13 (1993), 31–51.
 Van Kooten, George H. and Jacques van Ruiten (edd.). Prestige of the Pagan Prophet Balaam in Judaism, Early Christianity and Islam''. Leiden: Brill, 2008.

Attribution

External links

 Bibliography on Balaam
 Biblical Hebrew Poetry – Reconstructing the Original Oral, Aural and Visual Experience
 The Oracles of Balaam (poetic portions of Numbers 23:7–24:24) Reconstructed

Angelic visionaries
Biblical figures in rabbinic literature
Book of Numbers people
Moses
Prophets of the Hebrew Bible